Ma'anyan may refer to:

 Ma'anyan language
 Ma'anyan people